This article is about the particular significance of the year 1975 to Wales and its people.

Incumbents

Secretary of State for Wales – John Morris
Archbishop of Wales – Gwilym Williams, Bishop of Bangor
Archdruid of the National Eisteddfod of Wales
Brinli (outgoing)
Bryn (incoming)

Events
20 March - Opening of the Cleddau Bridge at Milford Haven.
14 April - Actor/singer Michael Flanders dies suddenly of an intracranial berry aneurysm while on holiday in Betws-y-Coed.
May - A leak from the Esso Tenby tanker off the coast of Pembrokeshire kills an estimated 1,300 seabirds.
28 July - 8 people are injured when a train is derailed between Sarnau and St Clears.
19 November - The Wales national football team qualifies for the quarter-finals of UEFA Euro 1976, beating Austria 1-0 in Wrexham.
date unknown - The Glamorgan-Gwent Archaeological Trust is established.

Arts and literature
Ryan and Ronnie announce the end of their comedy partnership.

Awards

National Eisteddfod of Wales (held in Criccieth)
National Eisteddfod of Wales: Chair - Gerallt Lloyd Owen
National Eisteddfod of Wales: Crown - Elwyn Roberts
National Eisteddfod of Wales: Prose Medal - withheld

New books

English language
Gwynfor Evans - National Future for Wales
Jeremy Hooker - Soliloquies of a Chalk Giant
Emyr Humphries - Flesh and Blood
Joseph Jenkins - Diary of a Welsh Swagman (posthumous)
Richard Llewellyn - Green, Green, My Valley Now
Moelwyn Merchant - Breaking the Code
Prys Morgan - Iolo Morganwg
Leslie Norris - Mountains, Polecats, Pheasants and other Elegies
Bernice Rubens - I Sent a Letter to My Love
Peter Tinniswood - Except You're a Bird
Rhydwen Williams - The Angry Vineyard

Welsh language
Aneirin Talfan Davies - Diannerch Erchwyn a Cherddi Eraill
J. Eirian Davies - Cân Galed
T. Glynne Davies - Marged
Richard Cyril Hughes - Catrin o Ferain
T. Llew Jones - Tân ar y Comin
Alan Llwyd - Edrych Trwy Wydrau Lledrith
Marged Pritchard - Gwylanod ar y Mynydd
Eurys Rowlands (ed.) - Lewys Môn
Gwyn Thomas - Y Pethau Diwethaf a Phethau Eraill

New drama
W. S. Jones - Y Toblarôn
Saunders Lewis - Dwy Briodas Ann

Music
Max Boyce - We All Had Doctors' Papers
Edward H. Dafis - Ffordd Newydd Eingl-Americanaidd Grêt o Fyw
Dave Edmunds - Subtle As A Flying Mallet
Andy Fairweather-Low - La Booga Rooga, album featuring the top ten hit single "Wide Eyed and Legless"

Film
Rachel Roberts appears in Picnic at Hanging Rock.
Ken Loach's Days of Hope is partly set in Wales.

Welsh-language films
None

Broadcasting

Welsh-language television
The Siberry Report recommends a new Welsh-language fourth channel broadcasting 25 hours a week of Welsh-language programmes, with BBC and HTV each responsible for 50% of the output.

English-language television
Grand Slam, starring Hugh Griffith and Windsor Davies
How Green Was My Valley adapted for television by Elaine Morgan, starring Stanley Baker, Sian Phillips, Mike Gwilym, Nerys Hughes and Gareth Thomas.
Angharad Rees stars in Poldark.

Sport
Boxing – Pat Thomas wins the British Welterweight title.
Darts – Wales win the Home International Series.
Football – The Wales national football team qualifies for the quarter-finals of UEFA Euro 1976.
Snooker – Ray Reardon wins his fourth World Championship title.
Arfon Griffiths wins BBC Wales Sports Personality of the Year.

Births
12 March - Richard Harrington, actor
21 March - Mark Williams, snooker player
5 April - John Hartson, footballer
22 May - Kelly Morgan, badminton player
18 June - Jem, singer
1 July - Hayley Tullett, athlete
24 July - Dafydd James, rugby player
4 September - Kai Owen, actor
26 September - Dai Thomas, footballer
19 October - Jamie Donaldson, golfer
28 October - Adrian Durston, rugby player
5 November - Lisa Scott-Lee, singer
25 November - Paul Mealor, composer
date unknown
Euros Childs, songwriter
Cynan Jones, novelist

Deaths
14 February - Arthur Probert, politician, 67
23 February - Ossie Male, rugby player, 81
3 March - T. H. Parry-Williams, poet, 87
15 March - Edward James, cricketer, 78
6 April - Tom Morgan, cricketer, 81
23 April - Pete Ham, musician, leader of the group Badfinger (suicide), 27
24 April - Stephen Halden Beattie, recipient of the Victoria Cross, 67
21 May - A. H. Dodd, historian, 83
7 June - Jack Smith, footballer, 63
7 August - Jim Griffiths, politician, 84
27 August - Noel Morgan, cricketer, 69 
4 September - Walley Barnes, footballer and broadcaster, 55
5 October - Will Davies, rugby player, 69
6 November - Norman Riches, cricketer
10 November - Emrys Davies, cricketer, 71
18 December - R. Ifor Parry, minister, teacher and philanthropist, 67
date unknown
Robert Herring, poet and critic, 72
Alun Jeremiah Jones (Alun Cilie), poet
Huw Lloyd Edwards, dramatist

See also
1975 in Northern Ireland

References

 
Wales
 Wales